Claes is a masculine given name, a version of Nicholas, as well as a patronymic surname. It is also spelled Klas, Clas and Klaes.

Given name
Claes is a common first name in Sweden. It was also a common name in the Low countries until the 18th century, after which the spelling Klaas was largely adopted. People with the given name Claes include:
 Claes Adelsköld (1824–1907), Swedish engineer, military officer and politician
 Claes Andersson (b. 1937), Finnish psychiatrist and politician
 Claes Bang (b. 1967), Danish actor and musician 
 Claes van Beresteyn (1627–1684), Dutch landscape painter
 Claes Berglund (b.~1960), Swedish ski-orienteering competitor
 Claes Björklund (b. 1971), Swedish musician, producer and songwriter
 Claes Michielsz Bontenbal (1575–1623), Dutch civil servant involved in a conspiracy against Maurice of Orange
 Claes Borgström (1944–2020), Swedish lawyer and politician
 Claes Compaen (1587–1660), Dutch privateer, pirate, and merchant
 Claes Cronqvist (b. 1944), Swedish former footballer
 Claes Cronstedt, Swedish lawyer
 Claes Dahlbäck (b. 1948), Swedish businessman
 Claes Duyst van Voorhout (fl. 1638), Dutch brewer painted by Frans Hals
 Claes Egnell (1916–2012), Swedish sport shooter
 Claes Eklundh (b. 1944), Swedish artist
 Claes Elefalk (b. 1959), Swedish sports agent
 Claes Elfsberg (b. 1948), Swedish television journalist
 Claes Elmstedt (b. 1928), Swedish politician
 Claes Eriksson (b. 1950), Swedish director, actor, comedian and composer
 Claes Fellbom (b. 1943), Swedish director, writer and composer
 Claes Fornell, Swedish-born American entrepreneur
 Claes af Geijerstam (b. 1946), Swedish musician, radio personality and DJ
 Claes Gill (1910–1973), Norwegian author, poet and actor
 Claes Dirksz van der Heck (1595–1649), Dutch painter
 Claes Jacobsz van der Heck (1575–1652), Dutch painter
 Claes Hellgren (b. 1955), Swedish handball player
 Claes van Heussen (1598–1633), Dutch still life painter
 Claes Hylinger (b. 1943), Swedish novelist, essayist, poet and literary critic
 Claes Johanson (1884–1949), Swedish wrestler
 Claes Kronberg (b. 1987), Danish footballer
 Claes Lang (1690–1761), Finnish painter
 Claes Loberg (b. 1970), Swedish-born Australian technology entrepreneur
 Claes Malmberg (b. 1952), Swedish former footballer
 Claes Malmberg (b. 1961), Swedish actor and stand-up comedian
 Claes Pietersz van der Meulen (1642–1693), Dutch glass painter
 Claes Corneliszoon Moeyaert (1592–1655), Dutch painter
 Claes Nobel (b. 1930), Swedish humanitarian and environmentalist
 Claes Nordén (b. 1993), Swedish ice hockey player
 Claes Nordin (b. 1955), Swedish badminton player
 Claes Oldenburg (1929–2022), Swedish-born American pop art sculptor
 Claes Pieterszoon (1593–1674), Dutch surgeon and mayor of Amsterdam
 Claes Rålamb (1622–1698), Swedish statesman
 Claes Roxbergh (b. 1945), Swedish politician
 Claes G. Ryn (b. 1943), Swedish-born American political scientist
 Claes Isaacsz Swanenburg (1572–1652), Dutch painter
 Claes Tholin (1860–1927), Swedish politician
 Claes Tornberg (born 1936), Swedish rear admiral
 Claes Uggla (1614–1676), Swedish military officer
 Claes Västerteg (b. 1972), Swedish politician
 Claes Jansz Visscher (1587–1652), Dutch draughtsman, engraver, mapmaker and publisher
 Claes Wersäll (1888–1951), Swedish gymnast

Claës
 Claës Fredrik Hornstedt (1758–1809), Swedish naturalist, taxonomist and illustrator
 Claës König (1885–1961), Swedish noble man and horse rider
 Claës Lindsström (1876–1964), Swedish vice admiral
 Claës Palme (1917–2006), Swedish maritime lawyer
 Claës Rundberg (1874–1958), Swedish sport shooter

Surname
Claes is the 7th most common surname in Belgium (16,840 people in 1998) and the most common surname in Belgian Limburg. In contrast, only 405 people have the surname in the Netherlands. People with the last name Claes include:
 Dirk Claes (b. 1959), Belgian politician
 Ernest Claes (1885–1968), Belgian author
 Gabrielle Claes, Belgian museum curator
 Georges Claes (1920–1994), Belgian racing cyclist
 Glenn Claes (b. 1994), Belgian footballer
 Ian Claes (b. 1981), Belgian former footballer
 Johnny Claes (1916–1956), Belgian racing driver
 Kelly Claes (b. 1995), American volleyball player
 Paul Claes (b. 1943), Belgian writer, poet and translator
 Virginie Claes (b. 1982), Miss Belgium 2006
 Willy Claes (b. 1938), Belgian politician, Secretary General of NATO 1994-1995
 Wouter Claes (b. 1975), Belgian badminton player

See also
 Clas (given name)
 Claus, given name and surname
 Klaas, given name and surname
 Nicholas
 Claas, German agricultural machinery manufacturer

Fictional
 Catarina Claes, main character of Japanese novel and anime series My Next Life as a Villainess: All Routes Lead to Doom!

References

External link

Scandinavian masculine given names
Dutch masculine given names
Dutch-language surnames
Swedish masculine given names
Surnames of Belgian origin
Patronymic surnames